is a city in Okayama Prefecture, Japan. , the city had an estimated population of 97,507 in 45653 households and a population density of 190 persons per km².

Geography
Tsuyama is located in north-central Okayama Prefecture, with the Chugoku Mountains separating it from Tottori Prefecture to the north. It is the largest city in the northern part of the prefecture in terms of population and economy.

Adjoining municipalities
Okayama Prefecture
Maniwa
Kagamino
Shōō
Nagi
Misaki
Tottori Prefecture
Tottori
Chizu

Climate
Tsuyama has a humid subtropical climate (Köppen climate classification Cfa) with very warm summers and cold winters.  The average annual temperature in Tsuyama is 13.6 °C. The average annual rainfall is 1501 mm with September as the wettest month. The temperatures are highest on average in January, at around 25.6 °C, and lowest in January, at around 1.9 °C.

Demographics
Per Japanese census data, the population of Tsuyama in 2020 is 99,937 people. Tsuyama has been conducting censuses since 1950.

History 
Tsuyama was the center of ancient Mimasaka Province and the location of its kokufu and the Mimasaka Kokubun-ji. It was also on the pilgrimage route to Izumo Shrine and had a number of inn stations. In the latter half of the Sengoku period, Mori Ranmaru's younger brother, Mori Tadamasa, received received the area as his domain and constructed Tsuruyama Castle on the site of an ancient castle which had been erected by the Yamana clan and laud out a new castle town which became the nucleus of the modern city. At the same time, Tsuruyama was renamed "Tsuyama". Under the Tokugawa Shogunate, Tsuyama Castle was the headquarters of a cadet branch of the Matsudaira clan and the center of Tsuyama Domain. Tsuyama is known for the 17th century Tsuyama Castle, whose grandeur was said to rival that of Himeji Castle in neighboring Hyōgo Prefecture. The castle was destroyed in 1874, and today only the stone foundations remain, save for a single turret that was reconstructed in 2005. The castle ruins remain Tsuyama's main tourist attraction along with Joto Street, a narrow street of old, traditional buildings that was once part of the pilgrimage route from Kyoto to Izumo, and Shūraku-en, a traditional Japanese garden constructed in 1657. Following the Meiji restoration, the town of Tsuyama was established on June 1, 1889 with the creation of the modern municipalities system. It was raised to city status on February 11, 1929.

On February 28, 2005, the town of Kamo, the village of Aba (both from Tomata District), the town of Shōboku (from Katsuta District), and the town of Kume (from Kume District) were merged into Tsuyama.

Government
Tsuyama has a mayor-council form of government with a directly elected mayor and a unicameral city council of 28 members. Tsuyama, collectively with the towns of Kagamino, Nagi and Shōō, contributes four members to the Okayama Prefectural Assembly. In terms of national politics, the city is part of the Okayama 3rd district of the lower house of the Diet of Japan.

Economy
Tsuyama has a mixed economy based on manufacturing, wholesale and retail commerce, and agriculture. The city has several industrial parks

Education
Tsuyama has 27 public elementary schools and none public junior high school operated by the city government, and four public high schools operated by the Okayama prefectural Board of Education. There are also two private high schools.  Mimasaka University and the Tsuyama National College of Technologyare both located in the city.

Transportation 
Tsuyama's main railway station is Tsuyama Station. The station is served by the Tsuyama Line (to Okayama), the Kishin Line (to Himeji and Niimi), and the Imbi Line (to Tottori). All services are operated by JR West. Tsuyama is one of the major cities along the Chūgoku Expressway. As with many Japanese cities, cycling is a very common form of transport, particularly among school students.

Railway 
 JR West (JR West) - Kishin Line
  -  -  -  -  - 
 JR West (JR West) - Imbi Line
  -  -  -  -  -  - Higashi-Tsuyama
 JR West (JR West) - Tsuyama Line
  -  -

Highways 
  Chūgoku Expressway

Sister cities
 Santa Fe, New Mexico, United States, friendship city since 1999

Local attractions

Tsuyama Castle, National Historic Site
Shūraku-en Garden, National Place of Scenic Beauty
Joto Street, Historic architecture preservation district
Nakayama Shrine, ichinomiya of Mimasaka Province
Tsuyama Archives of Western Learning
 Mitsukuri Genpo's Former Residence, National Historic Site
Tsuyama Museum of Science Education
Tsuyuma Historical Museum
Tsuyama Railroad Educational Museum 
Yokono Falls
Sakura Shrine (Innoshō-no-yakata site), National Historic Site
Tsuyama Wonder Museum
Sannari Kofun, National Historic Site
Miwayama Kofun Cluster, National Historic Site
Mimasaka Kokubun-ji ruins, National Historic Site

Festivals
Cherry Blossom Festival (early April) - This event is held in Kakuzan Park where around 5000 cherry blossom trees attract people from all over western Japan.  Many picnickers arrive before dawn and set down blue tarps and then remain until dusk, grilling out and drinking sake.
Gongo Festival (First Saturday and Sunday of August) - The Gongo, or Kappa, is a fictitious animal said to live in rivers. The festival is based around the legend that the Gongo can be seen in the Yoshii River in summer. Local people congregate on the banks of the river wearing traditional Japanese clothing and eat and drink at the many temporary stalls set up there. The festival culminates in a spectacular firework display on the Sunday evening.
Tsuyama Autumn Festival (Mid to late October) - Many people parade through the town pulling danjiri.
Lion Dance Festival (October 17) - The Lion Dance Festival, held at Takata Shrine, began around 710 A.D. to thank the gods for a good harvest. A male and female lion, each controlled by twelve dancers, perform a soul-stirring dance imitating a struggle. The lions keep time with a flute and drum. The dance is believed to drive away the devil and impurity.
Old Izumo Street Festival (Beginnining of November on Sunday) - A festival on Joto Street during which they wear traditional clothes and open a theater, tea houses, and various stalls.

Notable people from Tsuyama

 Yusuke Kodama, professional wrestler
 Joe Odagiri, actor
 Koshi Inaba, vocalist of B'z
 Shun Yashiro, actor
 Shinji Takahashi, baseball player
 Ayane Sakurano, actress
 Hiranuma Kiichirō, pre World War II right-wing politician

References

External links

 
 Tsuyama City official website , and some information in English
 Tsuyama tourism information , from the Japan National Tourism Organization
 Tsuyama High School with some information in English
 Tsuyama National College of Technology with some information in English

 
Cities in Okayama Prefecture